Blackjack Mountain may refer to:

 Blackjack Mountains, Arizona
 Blackjack Mountain (Carroll County, Georgia)
 Blackjack Mountain (Oklahoma)
 Blackjack Ski Resort (Bessemer, Michigan)